George Charles Aid or George Aid (1872–1938) born in Quincy, Illinois, was an American painter, etcher and teacher known for  portrait, landscape and genre painting. Aid was active in France, the Netherlands and The Carolinas.

Biography 
George Charles Aid studied at the St. Louis School of Fine Arts in St. Louis and started working as an illustrator for various St. Louis newspapers. In 1899, he was granted a scholarship to travel and study in Paris, France. He registered at the Académie Julian and started working under Jean-Paul Laurens and Jean-Joseph Benjamin-Constant as well as with Lucien Simon and Charles Cottet at the Académie de la Grande Chaumière.
He exhibited his work in art venues in France and the US, and he won a silver medal at the 1904 St. Louis World's Fair.

In 1906, the Swedish government purchased one of Aid's paintings as it was being shown at the Paris Salon. Aid was also invited to show his etching work, along with Clarence Gagnon, Huc-Mazelet Luquiens, and Herman Armour Webster. His work was reviewed by art critics such as Charles DeKay.

Aid stayed in France for fifteen years, meeting other American artists like Richard E. Miller and Frederick Carl Frieseke. He also met a young music student from South Carolina named Mary Orr, who became his wife in 1910. The couple moved to Italy.
 
After World War I started, George and Mary moved back to the United States. They travelled for several year, settling in Tryon, North Carolina in 1920. They chose Tryon because, like in Europe, they were able to find both a vineyard and an artistic colony. During the 1920s, George Charles Aid became a reputable artist by teaching etching and doing portraits of prominent people of the Carolinas. He was also commissioned to paint The Baptism of Virginia Dare commemorating early North Carolina history. The painting was later donated to the Mint Museum in Charlotte.

George Charles Aid died in Tryon in 1938.

Collections 
 Asheville Art Museum
 Smithsonian American Art Museum
 Metropolitan Museum of Art
 Art Institute of Chicago
 The Mint Museum of Art in Charlotte
 National Gallery of Art
 Tryon's History Museum 
 Lanier Library.
 The Johnson Collection, Spartanburg, South Carolina
 Springville Museum of Art 
 City Art Museum of Saint Louis
 Clark Art Institute

References

External links 
 George Charles Aid on Artnet
 George Charles Aid on Mutual Art
 George Charles Aid on Europeana.eu 
  George Charles Aid on The atticphantom

1872 births
1938 deaths
20th-century American painters
Académie Julian alumni
People from Quincy, Illinois